Cassillis railway station was a railway station serving the village of Minishant, South Ayrshire, Scotland. The station was originally part of the Ayr and Maybole Junction Railway (and later the Glasgow and South Western Railway).

History 

The station opened on 13 October 1856, and closed 6 December 1954.

The station was named after nearby Cassillis House, and consisted of two side platforms and a moderate sized station building. Since closure both platforms have been removed (and the line singled), however the station building remains intact as a private residence.

References

Notes

Sources 
 

Disused railway stations in South Ayrshire
Railway stations in Great Britain opened in 1856
Railway stations in Great Britain closed in 1954
Former Glasgow and South Western Railway stations